Ignoring is the present participle of ignore meaning: "to refuse to pay attention to; disregard".

Specific related tactics include:
 Tactical ignoring
 Silent treatment
 Shunning
 Social rejection
 Stonewalling

See also
 Avoidance (disambiguation)
 Ignorance